Velika humka is an archeological site and settlement near Pilatovići, Požega municipality, Serbia.

In 1983,  Velika humka was added to the Archaeological Sites of Exceptional Importance list, protected by Republic of Serbia.

See also
 Archaeological Sites of Exceptional Importance

References

Archaeological sites in Serbia
Archaeological Sites of Exceptional Importance